Barney Barnato (21 February 1851 – 14 June 1897), born Barnet Isaacs, was a British Randlord, one of the entrepreneurs who gained control of diamond mining, and later, gold mining in South Africa from the 1870s up to World War I. He is perhaps best remembered as being a rival of Cecil Rhodes.

Early life
Barney Barnato was born Barnet Isaacs in Aldgate, London on 21 February 1851. The son of Isaac and Leah Isaacs. He was educated by Moses Angel at the Jews' Free School and became a music hall entertainer and prizefighter. 

Barney grew up in Whitechapel. His mother, Leah, died in 1852. His father, Isaac Isaacs, made a living by selling second hand clothing and fabric remnants. Barney and his older brother Harry, left school in their early teens and entered their father's business. Their siblings were Kate, Sarah and Lizzie.

Barney and Harry performed on stage in the music halls. Harry was introduced as the Great Henry Isaacs and Barney as “and Barnett too." They became known as Bar-na-to, the Barnato Brothers.

Barney also made an income from prizefighting.

Career
In 1873, Barney joined his brother Harry in the Cape Colony during the diamond rush which accompanied the discovery of diamonds at Kimberley, and they eventually bought four claims in Kimberley.

Barnato Diamond Mining Company

Barney was a proponent of consolidating claims to alleviate production problems and to maintain the price of diamonds by stockpiling diamonds. Cecil Rhodes, working the De Beers mine, had the same idea and became a major competitor in the race to consolidate. 

Initially, there were more than 3,600 claims being mined at Kimberley. In time this number dropped to under one hundred, and Barnato Brothers were among those (they used this name from the time Barney arrived in Kimberley, completely dropping the Isaacs name).  As the Barnato Brothers made money, they ploughed it back into buying up claims. Barney aimed at complete consolidation of the Kimberley mine, but there were others players with similar goals.

A ‘battle royal’ ensued between Barney and Cecil Rhodes. The French Rothschild Bank was involved with Rhodes, as were a number of other wealthy men. All were experienced. All wanted control of the diamond mining interests of either Kimberley or De Beers. De Beers mine was the first to be consolidated—not by Barney, but by Rhodes, much to Barney's ire.

A French mining company, Compagnie Française des Mines de Diamants du Cap de Bonne Espérance, held a large block of claims that split the Kimberley mine in two. A wealthy Parisian diamond dealer, Jules Porges, owned it. Rhodes managed to secure substantial backing from Rothschild Bank to purchase this French Company. 
Barney got wind of the sale and telegraphed Porges asking for an opportunity to bid if a sale were imminent. Rhodes bid £1,400,000 to buy the company. Barney topped the offer by bidding  £1,750,000.

Before getting a response from Porges, Rhodes telegraphed Barney and asked him to withdraw his offer. In return, Rhodes made Barney a tempting offer, one that he could not refuse.

In return for withdrawing the offer, Rhodes would buy the French Company at his original bid price and sell it to Barney for £300,000 plus a twenty per cent holding in the Barnato's Kimberley Central Diamond Mining Company.

There is no doubt that this must have been a difficult decision to make. It would give him what he obsessed about, the control of the Kimberley Mine, enabling him to convert it to underground mining. The dilemma was that he was giving up a large part of his company to a rival. They may have been competitors, but Rhodes and Barney actually liked each other and got on well, even though they came from diverse backgrounds and upbringings.

After several days of consideration, Barney agreed to withdraw his offer and a month later the French Company was in his hands.

Rhodes undoubtedly calculated the odds well. He and his partners had been buying up shares in the open market in Kimberley Central DMC and may well have had ten to fifteen per cent of the shares at the time of the sale of the French Company. With the extra twenty per cent, they were well on their way to gaining control of Kimberley Central DMC. 
Barney tried to keep control of his own company, but Rhodes outsmarted him, finally gaining control of Kimberley Central DMC a few months later. The upside was that shares in Kimberley Central DMC rose from £14 to £49 each because of the competition from both camps. The downside was that it was higher diamond production that was fuelling the buying spree. Resulting in diamond prices hitting an all-time low.

Rhodes proposed that they merge the De Beers DMC into Kimberley Central DMC, forming one new consolidated company; De Beers Consolidated Mines. The merger made sense, even though they both knew that the merger would upset some of the shareholders.

Barney emerged as the largest shareholder with 6,658 shares in the new company. Not all the investors were happy with this situation. A group of shareholders from Kimberley Central applied in the Supreme Court of the Cape to stop the merger. The judge ruled in favor of the applicants. The result was that Kimberley Central was liquidated and the De Beers Consolidated purchased the company.

The Barnato Brothers shares ultimately were bought out for the astronomical sum of £5,338,650 in 1889.

	As part of their control of all diamond mining in the Cape Colony, De Beers Consolidated purchased two other mines in the area, Bultfontein and Du Toitspan. The yield on the latter was poor, but the quality of the diamonds found there was far superior to all the other mines. It was a gamble that underground mining could eventually make both of these mines productive.

Neither one of these was showing a return on investment, but they could not be allowed to pass into the hands of a competing company which might mean that at some point, they could undermine the prices, undoing the efforts made to stabilize prices.  The most important thing that the merger produced was the 95% control of worldwide diamond production. Both Barney and Rhodes were in full agreement on this.

The purchase cheque, signed by Rhodes, is said to have been the largest such instrument ever presented for payment up to that time. Barnato subsequently became Kimberley's member of parliament in the Cape Parliament from 1889 until his death.

Rhodes and Barney planned to reduce the number of buyers for the rough diamonds to ten companies who would in turn sell to the diamond cutters and set up lines of distribution throughout the World. De Beers Consolidated duly carried out this plan and the ten companies became known as the syndicate. The syndicate included Barnato Brothers in London. Only these ten companies could buy production from De Beers Consolidated Mines.

Diamond prices leveled off and finally increased steadily in value. Regardless of production levels, supply was kept on or close to demand.

Barney turned his attention to the newly discovered gold area of the Witwatersrand or Rand as it became known.
Gold in quartz is extremely difficult to separate. It was not like alluvial gold that can be panned in water. It took a great deal of machinery and was costly. This was money that most miners did not have.

The wealthy diamond dealers and owners of Kimberley understood what it would take. They were prepared to make the investment that was needed and went to the Rand where they bought up the most promising claims.

At the time of the initial discovery, Barney did not want to detract from his plan to take control of Kimberley Mine and rejected Harry and Woolf's urging to invest in gold mining.

By 1888, after the consolidation of diamond mining had taken place, the Barnatos were late in coming to the mining town being called Johannesburg. Their big advantage was their coffers were full. And so began the start of a dozen gold mining companies floated on both the London Stock Exchange and the new Johannesburg exchange. These mining shares were given the nickname ‘kaffirs.’  
  
Gold did not fluctuate, as did the price of diamonds, it was possible to calculate the exact amount of profit that could be made from a gold mine. The Bank of England backed its currency using a gold standard. The Americans were about to introduce a gold standard for their currency having had a silver standard for many years. Every ounce of gold that was mined could be sold to one government or another at a set price.

Two doctors, MacArthur and Forrest, invented a new process for extracting gold from the ore using cyanide. It was possible to extract ninety-six per cent of the gold from the ore, using this process. Barney ordered the necessary equipment to be shipped from England to set up a cyanide plant for each of his mines.

Investing in the Rand became the Barnatos highest priority. With the help of nephews Woolf and Solly, Barney went on a buying spree spending more than a million pounds in one year. Additionally, he invested in all manner of infrastructure that he knew would be needed for the future growth of Johannesburg. He purchased land in the new town to build offices, shops and market stalls, including a new stock exchange. Recognizing the need for somewhere to live in town, Barney purchased a farm in the Doornfontein section and completed the construction of a large house on Saratoga Avenue in a new exclusive suburb. Anything and everything that was needed to stimulate the growth of Johannesburg, was considered.

Early in 1889, Barney floated his first gold mining company on the London and Johannesburg stock exchanges. The New Primrose Gold Mining Company was a combination of a number of claims he had purchased on two adjacent properties. At the same time he floated the Johannesburg Estate Company, which had nothing directly to do with gold mining, only real estate and peripheral businesses in the town.

After the formation of his Johannesburg Consolidated Investment Company that year, he went on a major acquisition plan and invested in multiple businesses; building materials, transport, food wagons and liquor.

Barnato doubled his fortune in the boom in South African gold mining shares of 1894–95 before losing most of it in the 1896 share collapse. He built, but never lived in, a vast house on the corner of Park Lane and Stanhope Gate in Mayfair, London, which was bought after his death by the banker Sir Edward Sassoon.

Personal life
Barney married Fanny Christina Bees. Together they had 3 children:
Leah "Lily" Primrose Barnato (1893–1933)
Isaac "Jack" Henry Woolf Barnato (c.1894–1918)
Woolf "Babe" Barnato (1895–1948)
He was also the father of Isabel Louisa Barnato (born 5 June 1891, died 19 June 1891), daughter of Isabella Barnato (born Isabella Clarke 30 November 1865, died 30 October 1891).

Death
Barnato died in 1897 in mysterious circumstances; records state that he was lost overboard near the island of Madeira, whilst on a passage home to England. Although some have wondered if this was suicide and suggested that the Jameson Raid had had a major impact on him and left him severely depressed, his family vigorously rejected that theory, saying that it was totally out of character for a man who had been a pioneer in the rough-and-ready days of emerging Southern Africa. His body was recovered from the sea and he was buried at Willesden Jewish Cemetery in London.

The theory regarding the suicide of Barnato has also been tied to sinister later events. One of his heirs, Woolf Joel was shot and killed in his business offices in Johannesburg by a con-man named Karl Frederick Kurtze who went away with the name of Ludwig von Veltheim in 1898. In the trial for murder, von Veltheim hinted that he was supposed to be orchestrating a plot to kidnap Paul Kruger, President of the Transvaal Boer Republic, that Barnato and Joel were backing. The murder stemmed from blackmail against Joel, but von Veltheim claimed he was only seeking his promised payment. As a result, von Veltheim was able to get an acquittal from a Boer Jury (possibly due to anti-British and anti-Semitic feelings towards the deceased). It was suggested by Brian Roberts, in his book The Diamond Magnates, that Barnato may have been approached by von Veltheim too, and unsettled by his physical threats and the possibility of exposure.

His will divided up his considerable fortune between his family, amongst which was his sister Sarah and her husband Abraham Rantzen, great-grandparents of TV presenter Esther Rantzen. Another beneficiary was his son, Woolf Barnato, who used part of the multimillion-pound fortune he inherited at the age of two, to become a pioneer racing driver in the 1920s, one of the so-called Bentley Boys.

Descendants
Barnato's granddaughter Diana Barnato Walker died in 2008 at the age of 90. She was the first British woman to break the sound barrier.

Cultural depictions
 Barney Barnato's life was the subject of a South African television mini-series, Barney Barnato, made in 1989 and first aired on SABC in early 1990.
 He was the inspiration for the character Reuben Rosenthall, also an alliteratively named Jew who became rich through South African diamond mining, in the A. J. Raffles short story A Costume Piece.

See also
 Joel family
 John Hays Hammond – A famous mining engineer, diplomat and philanthropist whom Barnato brought to Africa.
 List of unsolved deaths

References
Notes

Sources
 Barney Barnato, Oxford Dictionary of National Biography. Accessed 28 April 2006
 Brief biography of Barney Barnato
Rhodes and Barnato in Cecil Rhodes by Ian D. Colvin

External links

Further details regarding Barnato's death (and possible murder), including witness statements from the inquest held at the South Western Hotel on Friday 18 June 1897 before the Coroner, Mr W Coxwell
Portrait of Barnett Isaacs Barnato by Harry Furniss at the National Portrait Gallery

1851 births
19th-century English businesspeople
19th-century South African businesspeople
1890s missing person cases
1897 deaths
British mining businesspeople
Burials at Willesden Jewish Cemetery
Formerly missing people
Diamond dealers
English Jews
Joel family
Kimberley, Northern Cape
Missing person cases in Portugal
People educated at JFS (school)
People from Aldgate
People from Kimberley, Northern Cape
People lost at sea
Randlords
South African Jews
South African mining businesspeople
South African people of English-Jewish descent
Unsolved deaths